Phar Lap's Son is a 1936 New Zealand film directed by A. L. Lewis. Only part of it survives. It was shot in and around Dunedin.

Many of the crew who worked on it had worked on Down on the Farm (1935).

See also
List of films set or shot in Dunedin

References
New Zealand Film 1912–1996 by Helen Martin & Sam Edwards p47 (1997, Oxford University Press, Auckland)   

1936 in New Zealand
1936 films
1930s New Zealand films
New Zealand horse racing films
Lost New Zealand films